Hideto (written:) is a masculine Japanese given name. Notable people with the name include:

, Japanese film director
, Japanese professional baseball player
, Japanese architect
, Japanese footballer
, Japanese musician
Hideto Shigenobu (born 1954), Japanese golfer
, Japanese footballer
, Japanese footballer
, Japanese musician
, Japanese golfer

Japanese masculine given names